Poly(ADP-ribose) polymerase family member 14 is a protein that, in humans, is encoded by the PARP14 gene.

Function
Poly(ADP-ribosyl)ation is an immediate DNA damage-dependent post-translational modification of histones and other nuclear proteins that contributes to the survival of injured proliferating cells. PARP14 belongs to the superfamily of enzymes that perform this modification (Ame et al., 2004 [PubMed 15273990]).

References

Further reading 

Cellular processes
Molecular genetics
Mutation

Senescence